Ernesto Canto Gudiño (18 October 1959 – 20 November 2020) was a Mexican race walker who mainly competed in the 20 kilometer walk.

He competed for Mexico at the 1984 Summer Olympics held in Los Angeles, United States, where he won the gold medal in the men's 20 kilometer walk event.

Canto died in 2020 at the age of 61 from pancreatic and liver cancer.

Personal bests
20 km: 1:19:37 hrs –  Xalapa, 5 April 1987
50 km: 3:52:16 hrs –  Prague, 12 April 1982

Achievements

References

External links

 

1959 births
2020 deaths
Mexican male racewalkers
Olympic gold medalists for Mexico
Athletes (track and field) at the 1984 Summer Olympics
Athletes (track and field) at the 1988 Summer Olympics
Athletes (track and field) at the 1992 Summer Olympics
Olympic athletes of Mexico
Athletes from Mexico City
Athletes (track and field) at the 1983 Pan American Games
Athletes (track and field) at the 1987 Pan American Games
Athletes (track and field) at the 1991 Pan American Games
World Athletics Championships athletes for Mexico
World Athletics Championships medalists
Medalists at the 1984 Summer Olympics
Pan American Games gold medalists for Mexico
Olympic gold medalists in athletics (track and field)
Pan American Games medalists in athletics (track and field)
Goodwill Games medalists in athletics
Central American and Caribbean Games gold medalists for Mexico
Competitors at the 1982 Central American and Caribbean Games
Competitors at the 1986 Central American and Caribbean Games
Competitors at the 1990 Central American and Caribbean Games
World Athletics Race Walking Team Championships winners
World Athletics Indoor Championships medalists
World Athletics Championships winners
Central American and Caribbean Games medalists in athletics
Competitors at the 1990 Goodwill Games
Medalists at the 1983 Pan American Games
20th-century Mexican people